Christopher Robert Wellesley Grant (19 December 1935 – 22 October 2017) was an English cricketer active in the late 1960s. Born at Lincoln, Lincolnshire, Grant was a left-handed batsman. He died at Newark-on-Trent, Nottinghamshire.

Grant made his debut in first-class cricket for Nottinghamshire against Derbyshire in the 1968 County Championship, with him making two further first-class appearances in 1968 against the touring Australians and Sussex. He scored 125 runs in his three matches, top-scoring with 48. He also made a single appearance in List A cricket in 1968, against Worcestershire in the Gillette Cup.

References

External links
Christopher Grant at ESPNcricinfo
Christopher Grant at CricketArchive

1935 births
2017 deaths
Cricketers from Lincoln, England
English cricketers
Nottinghamshire cricketers